Isabelle Marie Anne de Truchis de Varennes (born 18 April 1964), better known by her stage name Zazie, is a French singer-songwriter and former fashion model. Her greatest hits include "Je suis un homme", "À ma place" and "Speed". She co-produces all her albums and is noted for her playful use of language.

Biography

Early life 
Isabelle de Truchis de Varennes was born in Boulogne-Billancourt, France.  She was nicknamed "Zazie" in reference to the title character of the Raymond Queneau novel Zazie dans le métro. Her mother was a music teacher and her father, Hervé de Truchis de Varennes, was an architect. At home, they listened to Georges Brassens, Jacques Brel and Barbara, as well as classical music.  Inspired, Zazie began learning to play the violin at the age of ten, later teaching herself to play the piano and guitar. After high school, Zazie began studying to become a psychotherapist; however, her classic beauty and nearly six-foot stature caught the attention of modelling agents, and she abandoned her schooling to become a fashion model.

1992: Initial Forays into Music and Je, Tu, Ils 
In 1990, Zazie began her musical career. She signed a contract with Phonogram in 1991. In 1992, she released Je, tu, ils, her first album recorded in the studios of Peter Gabriel. She collaborated for the first time with Pascal Obispo on the song "Un, deux, trois, soleil". She wrote almost all the tracks of the album and participated in the composition. The album had minor success, and the single "Sucré salé" was ranked No. 46 on the Top 50 (French SNEP Singles Chart). The following year, Zazie was awarded 'Best New Female Pop Artist of the Year' (révélation variétés féminine de l'année) at the Victoires de la musique. The other two singles from the albums were much less successful, but the singer's career was launched. Her record label agreed to sign for a second album.

From Je, tu, ils Zazie distinguished herself as a songwriter by crafting songs notable for their wit, alliteration, homophonies and double entendres.

From 1995: Success 
In 1995, she released her second album Zen, which was co-written by and co-produced with Vincent-Marie Bouvot. The album produced the singles "Zen" and "Homme sweet homme". Her 1996 single "Un point c'est toi" from the same album was discussed on Canada's MuchMusic TV program Too Much 4 Much due to its controversial content. Ultimately, the discussion panel deemed the video okay for audiences. In the video, a group of four smitten women, including Zazie, follow a pair of men down to a lake. There, the two men strip off their clothes and swim in the water. Zazie fantasizes about undressing one of the men and kissing him. However, her fantasies are spoiled as the two men kiss each other.

In 1997, Pascal Obispo and Zazie released the single "Les meilleurs ennemis".

Her 1998 album Made in Love was co-produced by Ali Staton, Pierre Jaconelli, and herself. The album photos were taken by fashion designer Jean-Baptiste Mondino. The songs "Ça fait mal et ça fait rien", "Tous des anges", and "Tout le monde" were released as singles. This album was followed by a live album, Made in Live, the next year. In 1999 she also wrote a song for Jane Birkin.

In 2001, Zazie teamed up with Axel Bauer on the single "À ma place". It was her most successful single in France, reaching number four on the French charts.

Zazie once again addressed homosexuality on her 2002 single "Adam et Yves" from her 2001 album La Zizanie. This album was produced solely by Pierre Jaconelli. Other singles included "Rue de la paix" and "Danse avec les loops". In 2003, she released another live album, Ze Live.

Her 2004 album Rodéo was co-produced with Jean-Pierre Pilot and Philippe Paradis. The video for the single "Excuse-moi" features Zazie playing the role of an Indian woman who leaves her cheating husband. She followed this album up with a live album, Rodéo Tour in 2006.

Her sixth album, Totem, was released in February 2007. Like her previous album, it was co-produced with Jean-Pierre Pilot and Philippe Paradis. The "Totem Tour" began on 1 July.

Also in 2007, she wrote several songs for Christophe Willem's album, Inventaire.

In June 2010, Zazie released a new single "Avant l'amour" (Before Love). Avant l'amour was the first single from the album "Za7ie"; it reached No. 54 on the French SNEP radio airplay chart.

"Za7ie" was constructed as a concept project of 49 songs, split into seven theme albums of seven songs each. A shorter version with 14 songs was released in September 2010, with the 49 song project released as a box set in November of the same year.

Zazie announced eighth album, "Cyclo", which is scheduled for release in spring 2013. The album was produced by Olivier Coursier of AaRON and mixed by Tony Hoffer.

In 2015, she released her ninth album "Encore heureux".

On May 24, 2018, Zazie released a single "Speed". Her tenth studio album, "Essenciel" was released on September 7, 2018. On October 5, the SNEP announces that the disc is certified gold. On February 15, 2019 "Essenciel" was certified platinum for more than 100,000 copies sold. on February 15, 2019.

Her new tour "Essenciel Tour" began in March 2019.

Other activities 
Zazie co-composed the music of the 1997 film Ma vie en rose.

Zazie made her acting debut in the 1998 film by Didier Le Pêcheur "J'aimerais pas crever un dimanche" (Don't Let Me Die on a Sunday).,

In 2007, Zazie wrote and co-composed seven of the fifteen tracks of Christophe Willem's first album, Inventaire, while also providing backing vocals in the tracks she wrote.

In 2009, she participated in Rendez-vous en terre inconnue.

Zazie started coaching on the French version of The Voice in 2015 and one of her team, Lilian Renaud, won that 4th season. She again coached in 2016, 2017 and 2021 for All Stars format.

Philanthropy 
Zazie has been a member of the Les Enfoirés charity ensemble since 1997.

Awards and Nominations
{| class="wikitable sortable plainrowheaders" 
|-
! scope="col" | Award
! scope="col" | Year
! scope="col" | Nominee(s)
! scope="col" | Category
! scope="col" | Result
! scope="col" class="unsortable"| 
|-
!scope="row" rowspan=21|Victoires de la Musique
| 1993
| rowspan=2|Herself
| Female Revelation of the Year
| 
| 
|-
| rowspan=2|1996
| Female Artist of the Year
| 
| rowspan=2|
|-
| "Larsen"
| rowspan=2|Music Video of the Year
| 
|-
| rowspan=2|1997
| "Un point c'est toi"
| 
| rowspan=2|
|-
| rowspan=2|Herself
| rowspan=2|Female Artist of the Year
| 
|-
| rowspan=2|1998
| 
| 
|-
| "Les meilleurs ennemis"
| rowspan=2|Music Video of the Year
| 
|-
| rowspan=2|1999
| "Ça fait mal et ça fait rien"
| 
| rowspan=2|
|-
| Made in Love
| Pop/Rock Album of the Year
| 
|-
| rowspan=3|2002
| Herself
| Female Group or Artist of the Year
| 
| rowspan=3|
|-
| La Zizanie
| Song/Variety Album of the Year
| 
|-
| "À ma place"
| Original Song of the Year
| 
|-
| rowspan=2|2006
| Herself
| Female Group or Artist of the Year
| 
| rowspan=2|
|-
| Rodeo Tour
| Musical Show, Tour or Concert of the Year
| 
|-
| 2007
| Rodéo Tour
| Music DVD of the Year
| 
| 
|-
| rowspan=5|2008
| Herself
| Female Group or Artist of the Year
| 
| rowspan=5|
|-
| Totem
| Song/Variety Album of the Year
| 
|-
| rowspan=2|"Je suis un homme"
| Original Song of the Year
| 
|-
| Music Video of the Year
| 
|-
| Totem Tour
| Musical Show, Tour or Concert of the Year
| 
|-
| 2009
| "J'étais là"
| Music Video of the Year
| 
|

Discography

Studio albums

Live albums

Compilation albums 

1 Reached No. 1 on the French compilations chart.

Extended plays

Singles 

A Promotional release only.

Other charted songs

Awards 
 Victoires de la musique :
 Musical show, tour or concert of the year (2006)
 Female group or artist of the year (2002)
 Female artist of the year (1998)
 Music video of the year: Larsen, directed by Philippe Andre; (1996)
 Popular music Female révélation of the year (1993)
 NRJ Music Awards :
 Best French language song (2002) with Axel Bauer for À ma place
Altogether she has six awards.

Personal life 
Zazie and her former partner, Fabien Cahen, have a daughter, Lola, who was born on 16 August 2002.

References

External links 
 Official site
 Biography of Zazie from Radio France Internationale
 Zazie's UK Label

1964 births
Living people
People from Boulogne-Billancourt
French women singer-songwriters
French women pop singers 
French singer-songwriters
Mercury Records artists
French female models